Acraea mahela is a butterfly in the family Nymphalidae. It is found on Madagascar.

Description

A. mahela Bdv. (53 c). Both wings thinly scaled, with light ochre-yellow ground-colour; fore wing diaphanous in the distal part as far as the discal dots and with distinct discal dots in 1 b to 6, a transverse streak at the end of the cell and a dot in the cell; hindwing with free basal and discal dots and small black spots at the distal margin on the extremities of the veins, both surfaces quite similarly coloured and marked. The sexes are quite similar. Madagascar.

Biology
The habitat consists of transformed grasslands and anthropogenic environments.

Taxonomy
It is a member of the Acraea terpsicore species group -   but see also Pierre & Bernaud, 2014 
Acraea (group horta) mahela Henning, 1993, Metamorphosis 4 (1): 8
Acraea (Acraea) (subgroup horta) mahela; Pierre & Bernaud, 2013, Butterflies of the World 39: 6, pl. 18, f. 5-6

References

External links

Images representing Acraea mahela at Bold

Butterflies described in 1833
mahela
Endemic fauna of Madagascar
Butterflies of Africa